Pagetopsis is a genus of marine ray-finned fish belonging to the family Channichthyidae, the crocodile icefishes. The species in this genus are found in the Southern Ocean.

Taxonomy
Pagetopsis was described as a genus in 1913 by the English ichthyologist Charles Tate Regan as a monotypic genus which had Champsocephalus macropterus, which had been described by the Belgian-born British ichthyologist George Albert Boulenger in 1907, as its only species. The genus name is a combination of opsis with Pagetodes, the name given by John Richardson in 1843 to an icefish frozen on the bow of HMS Terror which had been eaten by a cat before it could be preserved, Regan said that Pagetodes could not be used until that fish was rediscovered.

Species
There are currently two recognized species in this genus:
 Pagetopsis macropterus (Boulenger, 1907)
 Pagetopsis maculata Barsukov & Permitin, 1958

Characteristics
Pagetopsis has a forward curving spine on the snout and a slightly protruding lower jaw. There are radiating ridge on the operculum ending in 3 or 4 spiny points, the other opercular bones lack spiny points. There are two lateral lines, neither having any bony plates, although the middle lateral line is restricted to the caudal peduncle. The pelvic fin is fan shaped with a well developed membrane while the first dorsal fin is large and tall and is contiguous with the second dorsal fin.

Distribution and habitat
Pagetopsis Icefishes have a circumAntarctic distribution which extends as far north as the South Shetland Islands and the South Orkney Islands.

References

Channichthyidae
 
 Taxa named by Charles Tate Regan